Akmal Hakim Zakaria (born 25 September 1996) is a Malaysian professional racing cyclist, who currently rides for UCI Continental team .

Major results

2017
 1st Stage 2 Tour de Molvccas
2018
 6th Overall Tour de Siak
1st Stage 4
2019
 National Road Championships
2nd Road race
5th Time trial
2020
 National Road Championships
1st  Road race
2nd Time trial
2021 
 3rd Time trial National Road Championships

References

External links

Living people
1996 births
Malaysian male cyclists
20th-century Malaysian people
21st-century Malaysian people